Sebastian Marshall (born 29 May 1988) is a British rally co-driver.

Rally career
Sebastian Marshall began his rally career in 2005, co-driving for several drivers. In the 2008 Rallye Deutschland, he made his WRC debut, where he partnered Richard Moore in a Ford Fiesta ST.

In January 2015, it was announced he would be co-driving for Kevin Abbring for Hyundai Motorsport in the World Rally Championship. While their main focus would be the development of the new Hyundai i20 WRC, Abbring and Marshall were also entered on selected WRC events later in the year.

In the 2017 Rally de Portugal, he replaced Hayden Paddon's then veteran co-driver John Kennard, who was retired from professional career in the previous round. Marshall scored his first podium in Poland, and later in Australia, the crew achieved their second podium finish of the season.

In 2018, the crew was confirmed by the South Korean team to drive the third Hyundai i20 Coupe WRC on some selected rallies.

On 4 December 2018 Marshall was confirmed by Toyota for co-driving for Kris Meeke in 2019.

Results

WRC results

* Season still in progress.

References

External links

 Sebastian Marshall's e-wrc profile

1988 births
Living people
British rally co-drivers
World Rally Championship co-drivers